Platamus is a genus of beetles in the family Silvanidae, containing the following species:

 Platamus buqueti Grouvelle
 Platamus castaneus Grouvelle
 Platamus debilis Grouvelle
 Platamus deyrollei Grouvelle
 Platamus dufaui Grouvelle
 Platamus humeralis Reitter
 Platamus longicornis Sharp
 Platamus richteri Reitter
 Platamus schaumi Grouvelle
 Platamus sharpi Hetschko

References

Silvanidae